St. Helen's Church, Selston is a parish church in the Church of England in Selston, Nottinghamshire.

The church is Grade II* listed by the Department for Digital, Culture, Media and Sport as it is a particularly significant building of more than local interest.

History

The church is medieval but was restored in 1899 and a north aisle added.

In the churchyard there is a monolith of the type found in Derbyshire stone circles which suggests that the site was used for pagan worship before the church was built. The churchyard houses the grave of Daniel Boswell King of the Gypsies.

Parish structure

St. Helen's Church has a daughter church of St. Mary's Church, Westwood.

Organ

The church contains an organ by Henry Groves dating from 2010. A specification of the organ can be found on the National Pipe Organ Register.

Incumbents

1176 Adam
1244 Roger del Clay
1252 Verasour de Wansley
1287 John de Gateyford
1290 Robert de Gateyford
1310 Thomas de Hothum
1321 William de Ilkeston
1322 John de Kendale
1324 William de Leston
1339 William de Ros
1344 John Dell Hill de Panvil
1344 John de Arnale
1363 John Sheperly
1363 Henry Barton
1434 John Eyswayte
1434 Richard Twigge
1446 Richard Holt
1456 John Day
1483 John Derman
1490 John Wilson
1525 Rd. Martyn
1550 Nicholas Walker
1575 Thomas Taylor
1605 Thomas Mylner
1611 George Longden
1614 Peter Parote
1615 Franc Stephenson
1621 William Williamson
1624 Thomas Bowcher
1631 Henry Denham
1650 Samuel Sildon
1653 Charles Jackson
1662 William Pearson
1669 Nicholas Sore
1669 Robert Hettcliffe
1699 J Cooper (curate)
1713 J Cooper (called vicar)
1754 Anthony Carr
1805 I Pepper
1838 F Churchill
1843 J Hides
1855 George Frederick Williamson
1856 Robert John William Wright
1887 Charles Harrison
1916 Richard Dudley Weller
1924 Philip H Hart
1929 Palmer Allison Sharp
1936 Henry Wright Schofield
1945 Edward Frederick H Dunnicliffe (previously vicar of All Saints' Church, Nottingham)
1949 Hugh Bickersteth Biddell
1956 Gerald Nettleton Pearce
1962 Hubert Victor Simmons
1978 John Frederick Jacklin
1996 Robert White Yule
2001 Timothy Mitchell
2006 Fiona Shouler

Sources

Church of England church buildings in Nottinghamshire
Grade II* listed churches in Nottinghamshire